The Việt Nam Quốc Tự is located on  Blvd., District 10 of Ho Chi Minh City, Vietnam. The pagoda, seven stories tall, is full of colorful, oversized statues of religious figures. On the first and fifteenth of the month, the pagoda opens up its third and seventh floors to the public. On other days, the second floor is accessible; it features a shrine made up of miniature Buddhas floating against a cloudy sky mural.

The pagoda was built in 1963.

External links
 Quoc Tu Pagoda

Buddhist temples in Vietnam
Unified Buddhist Church Buddhists

Tiếng Việt